U Hydrae is a single star in the equatorial constellation of Hydra, near the northern constellation border with Sextans. It is a semiregular variable star of sub-type SRb, with its brightness ranging from visual magnitude (V) 4.7 to 5.2 over a 450-day period, with some irregularity. This object is located at a distance of approximately 680 light years from the Sun based on parallax. It is drifting closer with a radial velocity of −26 km/s.

This is a carbon-rich red giant star on the asymptotic giant branch – a carbon star – with s-process elements appearing in the spectrum. Technetium has been detected in the spectrum, suggesting the star has experienced a third dredge-up episode due to thermal pulses of the helium-burning shell some time within the last 100,000 years.

An ultraviolet (UV) excess has been detected coming from an extended elliptical ring that surrounds this star. The material was most likely ejected from the star due to mass loss episodes. The probable cause of the UV emission is from the movement of the star through space and possibly shock-excited molecules of H2. The emission does not show a bow-shock-like structure.

References

Carbon stars
Asymptotic-giant-branch stars
Semiregular variable stars

Hydra (constellation)
Durchmusterung objects
092055
052009
4163
Hydrae, U